The Farman F.40 was a French pusher  biplane reconnaissance aircraft.

Development
Developed from a mix of the Maurice Farman designed MF.11 and the Henry Farman designed HF.22, the F.40 (popularly dubbed the Horace Farman) had an overall smoother crew nacelle. An open tail boom truss supported a horizontal tailplane and a curved fin. The aircraft went into production in 1915.

Operational history
Forty French Air Force escadrilles (squadrons) were equipped with F.40s. They operated for just over a year, but were replaced in early 1917.

The F.40 was also operated by the No. 5 Wing of the Royal Naval Air Service, Belgian forces in France, and also by the Russians. The Portuguese Forces in Mozambique included a small squadron of F.40, which participated in the East African Campaign.

Italian aircraft maker Savoia-Marchetti built F.40s for use by the police force until 1922.

Variants
Data from:French aircraft of the First World War
F.402-seat reconnaissance aircraft with  Renault 130 hp,  span.
F.402-seat reconnaissance aircraft with  De Dion-Bouton 12B,  span.
F.40H2-seat seaplane trainer with  Renault 130 hp,  span.
F.40bis2-seat reconnaissance aircraft with  Renault 8Gc,  span.
F.40ter2-seat reconnaissance aircraft with  Lorraine 8A,  span.
F.40 QC2-seat reconnaissance aircraft with  Renault 130 hp,  span and elongated tail.
F.40Padaption to fire Le Prieur rockets
F.412-seat reconnaissance aircraft with  Renault 8B,  span.
F.41 H2-seat seaplane with  Renault 8B,  span.
F.41bis2-seat reconnaissance aircraft with  Lorraine 6AM,  span.
F.41bis H2-seat seaplane with  Lorraine 6AM,  span.
F.1,402-seat trainer powered by an  Renault 8B,  span.
F.1,40bis2-seat floatplane trainer powered by a  Lorraine 6AM,  span.
F.1,40bis2-seat trainer powered by a  Renault 8C,  span.
F.1,402/3-seat trainer powered by a  Renault 130 hp,  span.
F.1,40ter2-seat trainer powered by a  Lorraine 8Aby,  span.
F.1,412-seat trainer powered by a  Renault 8B,  span.
F.1,41 H2-seat floatplane trainer powered by a  Renault 8B,  span.
F.1,462-seat dual-control trainer powered by a  Renault 8B,  span.
F.2,412-seat trainer powered by a  Lorraine 8Bd,  span.

Army type numbers
The French Army applied type numbers to aircraft types in service. Initially these were used in a similar fashion to individual serial numbers, later used to denote similar aircraft types.

Army Type 42 F.40
Army Type 43 F.40
Army Type 44 F.41bis with  Lorraine 6AM engine.
Army Type 51 F.41.
Army Type 51 E2F.1,41 with wings of altered camber.
Army Type 56 F.40bis.
Army Type 57 F.40ter.
Army Type 60 F.1,40bis.
Army Type 61 F.1,40ter.

Military operators

Belgian Air Force

Brazilian Naval Aviation

Armée de l'Air

Hellenic Air Force

Corpo Aeronautico Militare

Royal Netherlands Air Force One aircraft only.

Norwegian Army Air Service

Portuguese Air Force

Romanian Air Corps

Imperial Russian Air Force

Serbian Air Force

Soviet Air Force - Taken over for the Russian Air Force.

Royal Naval Air Service

American Expeditionary Force

 Venezuelan Air Force - Two aircraft only.
 Venezuelan Navy

Civil operators

Compañía Colombiana de Navegación Aérea (CCNA)

Specifications (F.40 with Renault 130 hp engine)

References

Bibliography

Further reading
 
 

1910s French military reconnaissance aircraft
1910s French military trainer aircraft
Single-engined pusher aircraft
Biplanes
F.0040
Aircraft first flown in 1915